The 1908 North Carolina gubernatorial election was held on November 3, 1908. Democratic nominee William Walton Kitchin defeated Republican nominee J. Elwood Cox with 57.31% of the vote. At the time, Kitchin was a congressman, while Cox was a banker and manufacturer.

Democratic convention
The Democratic convention was held on June 27, 1908.

Candidates 
William Walton Kitchin, U.S. Representative
Locke Craig, former State Representative
Ashley Horne

Results

General election

Candidates
Major party candidates
William Walton Kitchin, Democratic
J. Elwood Cox, Republican

Other candidates
J.A. Transon, Socialist

Results

References

1908
North Carolina
Gubernatorial